William Young (5 February 1863 – 7 June 1942) was a Scottish Liberal Party politician who served as the MP in the parliament of the United Kingdom in representation of two constituencies in Perthshire.

He was first elected for East Perthshire at the January 1910 general election, and held the seat until the constituency was abolished in boundary changes for the 1918 general election.

He was then returned unopposed for the similar constituency of Perth as a supporter of David Lloyd George's coalition government.  He retired from the House of Commons at the 1922 general election.

He is buried in Brookwood Cemetery.

References

External links 
 

1863 births
1942 deaths
Burials at Brookwood Cemetery
Members of the Parliament of the United Kingdom for Scottish constituencies
Scottish Liberal Party MPs
UK MPs 1910
UK MPs 1910–1918
UK MPs 1918–1922